Myconet was a peer-reviewed mycological journal intended for the documentation of selected mycosystematic files published on the Internet. The journal was published from 1997 to 2007.

Publications established in 1997
Publications disestablished in 2007
Microbiology journals
Mycology journals